Man of the Cursed Valley (also known as The Man of the Accursed Valley) is a 1964 Italian-Spanish Spaghetti Western film directed by Siro Marcellini and starring Ty Hardin.

Plot

Cast 

 Ty Hardin as Johnny Walcott
 Irán Eory as Gwen Burnett
 Peter Larry as Torito  
 José Nieto as Sam Burnett
 John Bartha as Pater Ryan
  Tito García as Indio 
  Rafael Albaicín as Apache
  Joe Kamel as Outlaw
  Phil Posner as Outlaw

References

External links

Spaghetti Western films
Italian Western (genre) films
Spanish Western (genre) films
1964 Western (genre) films
1964 films
Films directed by Siro Marcellini
Films scored by Francesco De Masi
1960s Italian-language films
1960s Italian films